The 1992 Cheltenham Gold Cup was a horse race which took place at Cheltenham on Thursday 12 March 1992. It was the 65th running of the Cheltenham Gold Cup, and it was won by Cool Ground. The winner was ridden by Adrian Maguire and trained by Toby Balding. The pre-race favourite Carvill's Hill finished fifth.

It was a controversial result, as some observers felt that the rank outsider Golden Freeze was ridden with the intention of unsettling Carvill's Hill by jumping alongside him at every fence.

Race details
 Sponsor: Tote
 Winner's prize money: £95,533.00
 Going: Good
 Number of runners: 8
 Winner's time: 6m 47.6s

Full result

* The distances between the horses are shown in lengths or shorter. shd = short-head; PU = pulled-up; UR = unseated rider.† Trainers are based in Great Britain unless indicated.

Winner's details
Further details of the winner, Cool Ground:

 Foaled: 1982 in Great Britain
 Sire: Over the River; Dam: Merry Spring (Merrymount)
 Owner: Whitcombe Manor Racing Stables Ltd
 Breeder: N. J. Connors

References

 

Cheltenham Gold Cup
 1992
Cheltenham Gold Cup
Cheltenham Gold Cup
1990s in Gloucestershire